Cuatro Cienegas pupfish (Cyprinodon bifasciatus) is a species of fish in the Cyprinodon genus of the family Cyprinodontidae.

It is endemic to the Cuatro Cienegas springs in Coahuila state, northeastern Mexico.

See also
Pupfish
Cyprinodon (pupfish) species topics

References

Cyprinodon
Pupfish, Cuatro Cienegas
Pupfish, Cuatro Cienegas
Cuatrociénegas Municipality
Natural history of Coahuila
Pupfish, Cuatro Cienegas
Taxa named by Robert Rush Miller
Pupfish, Cuatro Cienegas
Fish described in 1968
Taxonomy articles created by Polbot